Princess Alice of Bourbon-Parma (27 December 1849 in Parma, Duchy of Parma – 16 January 1935 in Schwertberg, Austria) was the youngest daughter of Charles III, Duke of Parma and Princess Louise Marie Thérèse of France, the eldest daughter of Charles Ferdinand, Duke of Berry and Princess Caroline Ferdinande Louise of the Two Sicilies.

Marriage and issue
On 11 January 1868 Alice married Ferdinand IV, Grand Duke of Tuscany (1835–1908) at Schloss Frohsdorf in Lanzenkirchen, Austria. Ferdinand and Alice had ten children:
Archduke Leopold Ferdinand of Austria (1868–1935). He renounced his titles on 29 December 1902 and took the name Leopold Wölfling. He married three times.
Archduchess Louise of Austria (1870–1947)
Archduke Joseph Ferdinand of Austria (1872–1942). He married first Rosa Kaltenbrunner and, after divorcing her, he married second Gertrud Tomanek, by whom he had issue. Both marriages were morganatic.
Archduke Peter Ferdinand of Austria (1874–1948). Married Princess Maria Cristina of Bourbon-Two Sicilies and had issue.
 Archduke Heinrich Ferdinand of Austria (1878–1969). Major General in the Austrian Army. Married morganatically to Maria Karoline Ludescher and had issue.
 Archduchess Anna of Austria (1879–1961). Married Johannes, Prince of Hohenlohe-Bartenstein; their granddaughter married Count Hans Veit of Toerring-Jettenbach, son of Princess Elizabeth of Greece and Denmark.
 Archduchess Margareta of Austria (1881–1965).
 Archduchess Germana of Austria (1884–1955).
 Archduke Robert Ferdinand Salvator, Prince of Tuscany (1885–1895).
 Archduchess Agnes of Austria (1891–1945).

Ancestry

External links

|-

1849 births
1935 deaths
Princesses of Bourbon-Parma
House of Habsburg-Lorraine
Grand Duchesses of Tuscany
Nobility from Parma
Daughters of monarchs